Mapiripán Airport  is an airport serving the town of Mapiripán, in the Meta Department of Colombia. The runway and town are on the north bank of the Guaviare River, which is locally the border between Meta and Guaviare Departments.

See also

Transport in Colombia
List of airports in Colombia

References

External links
OpenStreetMap - Mapiripán
FallingRain - Mapiripán Airport

Airports in Colombia